Events in the year 1790 in India.

Events
National income - ₹10,434 million
 3rd Mysore War.

References

 
India
Years of the 18th century in India